Newton-with-Clifton is a civil parish in the Borough of Fylde and ceremonial county of Lancashire in England. It had a population of 2,735 at the 2011 census, up from 2,680 in 2001. The parish includes the villages of Clifton, Dowbridge, Newton-with-Scales and Salwick.

See also
Listed buildings in Newton-with-Clifton

References

Civil parishes in Lancashire
Geography of the Borough of Fylde